St George's Hundred may refer to:

 St. George's Hundred, Delaware in the United States.
 St George's Hundred, Dorset in England.